Akkalasandra  is a village in the southern state of Karnataka,near Dombaranahalli  India. It is located in the Turuvekere taluk of Tumkur district in Karnataka.

See also
 Tumkur
 Districts of Karnataka

References

External links
 http://Tumkur.nic.in/

Villages in Tumkur district